Dehestan-e Bala (also Romanized as Dehestān-e Bālā; also known as Dehistān and Ḩoseynābād) is a village in Dar Agah Rural District, in the Central District of Hajjiabad County, Hormozgan Province, Iran. At the 2006 census, its population was 710, in 163 families.

References 

Populated places in Hajjiabad County